The EURO Journal on Transportation and Logistics (EJTL) is a peer-reviewed  academic journal in operations research that was established in 2011 and is now published by Elsevier. It is an official journal of the Association of European Operational Research Societies, promoting the use of mathematics in general, and operations research in particular, in the context of transportation and logistics. 

The editor-in-chief is 
Dominique Feillet.

Past Editor-in-Chief:
Michel Bierlaire (2011-2019).

Abstracting and indexing 
The journal is abstracted and indexed in the following databases:
 EBSCO Information Services
 Emerging Sources Citation Index
 Google Scholar
 International Abstracts in Operations Research
 OCLC
 Research Papers in Economics
 Scopus
 Summon by ProQuest
 Transportation Research International Documentation (TRID) of Transportation Research Board

External links 
 

Operations research
English-language journals
Publications established in 2011
Transportation journals